There are at least 38 named lakes and reservoirs in Conway County, Arkansas.

Lakes
 Old River Lake, el.  
 Tank Lake, el.

Reservoirs
 Cargile Lake, el.  
 East Fork Point Remove Site Three Reservoir, el.  
 East Fork Point Remove Site Four Reservoir, el.  
 East Fork Point Remove Site Five Reservoir, el.  
 East Fork Point Remove Site Six Reservoir, el.  
 East Fork Point Remove Site Seven Reservoir, el.  
 East Fork Point Remove Site Eight Reservoir, el.  
 East Fork Point Remove Site Nine Reservoir, el.  
 East Fork Point Remove Site Ten Reservoir, el.  
 East Fork Point Remove Site 11 Reservoir, el.  
 Fish Lake, el.  
 Fowler Lake, el.  
 Lake Abby, el.  
 Lake Amanda, el.  
 Lake Bailey, el.  
 Lake Elsie, el.  
 Lake George, el.  
 Lake Jeannette, el.  
 Lake Lucy, el.  
 Lake Overcup, el.  
 Morrilton Sewage Lake, el.  
 Payne Lake, el.  
 Petit Jean State Park Lake, el.  
 Pool Nine, el.  
 Roosevelt Lake, el.  
 Timberlake Reservoir, el.  
 West Fork Point Remove Creek Site Four Reservoir, el.  
 West Fork Point Remove Creek Site Five Reservoir, el.  
 West Fork Point Remove Creek Site Six Reservoir, el.  
 West Fork Point Remove Creek Site Seven Reservoir, el.  
 West Fork Point Remove Creek Site 12 Reservoir, el.  
 West Fork Point Remove Creek Site 13 Reservoir, el.  
 West Fork Point Remove Creek Site 14 Reservoir, el.  
 West Fork Point Remove Creek Site 15 Reservoir, el.  
 West Fork Point Remove Creek Site 16 Reservoir, el.  
 Winrock Farms Lake, el.

See also

 List of lakes in Arkansas

Notes

Bodies of water of Conway County, Arkansas
Conway